Motinggo Busye was born in Lampung on November 21, 1937 and died in Jakarta on June 18, 1999. He was a prominent Indonesian writer and former chief editor of Penerbitan Nusantara. In the early half of the 1970s, Motinggo Busye also worked as a film producer. His most famous film is Bing Slamet Dukun Palsu (1973).

List of works
 Malam Jahanam (novel, 1962)
 Badai Sampai Sore (drama, 1962)
 Tidak Menyerah (novel, 1963)
 Hari Ini Tak Ada Cinta (novel, 1963)
 Perempuan Itu Bernama Barabah (novel, 1963)
 Dosa Kita Semua (novel, 1963)
 Tiada Belas Kasihan (novel, 1963)
 Nyonya dan Nyonya (drama, 1963)
 Sejuta Matahari (novel, 1963)
 Nasehat buat Anakku (compilation of short stories, 1963)
 Malam Pengantin di Bukit Kera (drama, 1963)
 Buang Tonjam (legend, 1963)
 Ahim-Ha (legend, 1963)
 Batu Serampok (legend, 1963)
 Penerobosan di Bawah Laut (novel, 1964)
 Titian Dosa di Atasnya (novel, 1964)
 Cross Mama (novel, 1966)
 Tante Maryati (novel, 1967)
 Sri Ayati (novel, 1968)
 Retno Lestari (novel, 1968)
 Dia Musuh Keluarga (novel, 1968)
 Sanu, Infita Kembar (novel, 1985)
 Madu Prahara (novel, 1985)
 Dosa Kita Semua (novel, 1986)
 Aura Para Aulia: Islamic poems (1990)
 Dua Tengkorak Kepala (1999)

1937 births
1999 deaths
Minangkabau people
Indonesian writers